Hong Sang-sam (born 13 February 1990) is a South Korean professional baseball pitcher for the Doosan Bears of the KBO League.

References

External links 
 Career statistics and player information from the KBO League
 Hong Sang-sam at Doosan Bears Baseball Club

Living people
KBO League players
KBO League pitchers
Doosan Bears players
1990 births